Butyl acrylate is an organic compound with the formula .  A colorless liquid, it is the butyl ester of acrylic acid.  It is used commercially on a large scale as a precursor to poly(butyl acrylate). Especially  as copolymers, such materials are used in paints, sealants, coatings, adhesives, fuel, textiles, plastics, and caulk.

Production and properties
Butyl acrylate can be produced by the acid-catalyzed esterification of acrylic acid with butanol. Since it polymerizes easily, commercial preparations may contain a polymerization inhibitor such as hydroquinone, phenothiazine, or hydroquinone ethyl ether.

Safety
Butyl acrylate is of low acute toxicity with an LD50 (rat) of 3143 mg/kg.

In rodent models, butyl acrylate is metabolized by carboxylesterase or reactions with glutathione; this detoxification produces acrylic acid, butanol, and mercapturic acid waste, which is excreted.

References

Acrylate esters
Monomers
Butyl compounds